Michael Oduor (born 6 September 1962) is a Kenyan judoka. He competed in the men's middleweight event at the 1992 Summer Olympics.

References

1962 births
Living people
Kenyan male judoka
Olympic judoka of Kenya
Judoka at the 1992 Summer Olympics
Place of birth missing (living people)